HMS Viking was a Tribal-class destroyer of the Royal Navy launched in 1909 and sold for scrap in 1919. She was the only destroyer ever to have six funnels.

Construction and design
HMS Viking was one of five Tribal-class destroyers ordered as part of the Royal Navy's 1907–08 shipbuilding programme. She was laid down at Palmers' Jarrow shipyard on 11 June 1908 and was launched on 14 September 1909.

She had a turtleback forecastle topped by a raised forward gun platform that also carried the ship's bridge. The raised gun platform acted as a breakwater, causing heavy spray that made it difficult to work  the forward gun or use the bridge. The outtakes from the boilers were fed to six funnels, making Viking the Royal Navy's only six-funneled destroyer.

Gun armament consisted of two 4 inch guns, the 12-pounder guns carried by earlier Tribals having been proved ineffective by trials against the old destroyer HMS Skate in 1906. Two 18 inch (450 mm) torpedo tubes were carried. The ship had a complement of 71.

Viking was commissioned in June 1910, having reached a speed of  during sea trials.

Service
On commissioning, Viking joined the First Destroyer Flotilla, remaining part of that unit until 1913. In October that year, the Tribals were officially designated the F class, and as such the letter "F" was painted on Afridis bows.

In February 1914, the Tribals, whose range was too short for effective open sea operations, were sent to Dover, forming the 6th Destroyer Flotilla. On the outbreak of the First World War, the 6th Flotilla formed the basis of the Dover Patrol, with which the Tribal class, including Viking served for the duration of the war.

In October 1914, the Dover Patrol was deployed to help support Belgian ground forces during the Battle of the Yser, carrying out shore bombardment operations. Viking suffered an explosion of its forward gun, wounding two and causing the ship to be withdrawn from the operations. (Viking was later awarded the Battle Honour "Belgian Coast 1914–18").

On 20 February 1915, Viking was patrolling anti submarine nets in the Dover strait when she saw indicator buoys being disturbed, and in the belief that this was due to a submarine being caught on the nets, called up several destroyers, including sister ship  and drifters to investigate. Although an explosive anti-submarine sweep was fired, no submarine was damaged. Viking fired her explosive sweep with no effect, but after the submarine was spotted by Maori, Ghurka used her own explosive sweep to force the German submarine to the surface. After briefly being shelled, the submarine was scuttled and abandoned, the crew surrendering.

Viking was damaged after hitting a mine near the Colbart Bank on 29 January 1916. Ten of Viking s crew were killed. On the night of 26/27 October 1916, German torpedo boats of their Flanders Flotilla carried out a large scale raid into the English Channel, hoping to attack the drifters watching the anti-submarine nets of the Dover Barrage, and to sink Allied shipping in the Channel. Viking was one of six Tribal-class destroyers waiting at readiness in Dover harbour, and when the Germans attacked the drifters and sank the supporting destroyer , they were ordered to intervene. The group led by Viking encountered a group of unknown warships. When Viking challenged the ships (which were in fact the German 18th Half Flotilla), the German ships replied with shellfire that hit Mohawk and caused her steering to jam. This caused Mohawk to block the course of Viking when she attempted to pursue the German torpedo boats, allowing them to escape unharmed. Nubian and Amazon separately ran into a second German formation, the  17th Half Flotilla, with Nubian first being badly damaged by a torpedo and Amazon then heavily hit by German shells.

In 1916, as an attempt to counter the superior range of the 10.5 cm (4.1-in) SK L/45 guns of German torpedo boats, Viking was experimentally rearmed, replacing the forward 4-inch gun with a BL 6-inch Mk VII (alongside HMS Swift, she was one of only two Royal Navy destroyers ever to carry such a weapon). The 6-inch gun proved too large for the Tribal class, and other ships did not receive this modification. On Viking, it was replaced in late 1916 by a QF 4-inch Mk V gun.

Notes

Citations

Bibliography

External links
 HMS Viking, Index of 19th Century Naval Vessels
 

 

Tribal-class destroyers (1905)
Ships built on the River Tyne
1909 ships
World War I destroyers of the United Kingdom